Jordan Lay (born 5 November 1992) is a Samoan rugby union player who has played 24 times for  and recently played club rugby for Pro14 side Ospreys on loan from Gallagher Premiership Rugby side Bristol Bears.

Lay was born in Samoa, but moved to New Zealand with his parents at age 3 and went to school in Auckland.

Playing career

In December 2017 Lay joined Pro14 side Edinburgh Rugby for the remainder of the season after a 2017 ITM Cup campaign with Bay of Plenty. A request to add Lay to Edinburgh's European Challenge Cup squad in January 2018 was declined.

On 23 August 2019, he was named in Samoa's 34-man training squad for the 2019 Rugby World Cup, before being named in the final 31 on 31 August.

References

Samoan rugby union players
Rugby union props
Edinburgh Rugby players
Living people
1992 births
Samoan emigrants to New Zealand
Samoa international rugby union players
Moana Pasifika players
Bristol Bears players
Ospreys (rugby union) players
Bay of Plenty rugby union players
Auckland rugby union players
Blues (Super Rugby) players